Mayoral and local district council elections were held in Somaliland on 31 May 2021 alongside parliamentary elections, after multiple delays. On 12 July 2020, Somaliland's major political parties reached a landmark agreement to ensure timely elections and to advance preparations for the elections. Negotiations between the parties and the National Electoral Commission settled on the earliest possible date by which the latter believed it would have sufficient time to prepare for the polls.

Number of voters 

1,065,847 people registered to vote in Somaliland's local elections. 552 candidates vied for 220 seats.

Results 

Preliminary results showed that Kulmiye won a plurality of seats with Waddani close behind, while UCID came in third place. Out of the 220 elected local councillors, 217 were men and 3 were women.

References 

Somaliland parliamentary election
Parliamentary election
Elections in Somaliland